A gospel (a contraction of Old English , meaning "good news/glad tidings", comparable to Greek) is a written account of the career and teachings of Jesus. The term originally meant the Christian message itself, but came to be used for the books in which the message was set out in the 2nd century.

Gospels are a genre of Early Christian literature that recount the life of Jesus. The New Testament has four canonical gospels, which are accepted as the only authentic scripture by the great majority of Christians, but many others exist, or used to exist, and are called either New Testament apocrypha or pseudepigrapha. Some of these have left considerable traces on Christian traditions, including iconography.

Canonical gospels

 Synoptic gospels:
 Gospel of Matthew
 Gospel of Mark
 Longer ending of Mark (see also the Freer Logion)
 Gospel of Luke
 Gospel of John

Hypothesized sources of the synoptic gospels

 Q source – Q is material common to Matthew and Luke, but not found in Mark
 M source – M is material unique to Matthew
 L source – L is material unique to Luke

Hypothesized sources of the Gospel of John
 Signs Gospel – narrative of the Seven Signs
 Discourses Gospel – source of the discourse material

Apocrypha and pseudepigrapha

Gnostic gospels

 Gospel of Thomas – The Gospel of Thomas (also known as the Coptic Gospel of Thomas) is a non-canonical sayings gospel.
 Gospel of Marcion – 2nd century, potentially an edited version of the Gospel of Luke (see: Marcionism)
 Gospel of Basilides – composed in Egypt around 120 to 140 AD, thought to be a Gnostic gospel harmony of the canonical gospels
 Gospel of Truth (Valentinian) – mid-2nd century, departed from earlier Gnostic works by admitting and defending the physicality of Christ and his resurrection
 Gospel of the Four Heavenly Realms – mid-2nd century, thought to be a Gnostic cosmology, most likely in the form of a dialogue between Jesus and his disciples
 Gospel of Mary – 2nd century Gnostic text
 Gospel of Judas – 2nd century Gnostic text
 Greek Gospel of the Egyptians – second quarter of the 2nd century
 Gospel of Philip – 3rd-century Gnostic text
 Gospel of the Twelve Apostles – a Syriac language gospel titled the Gospel of the Twelve, this work is shorter than the regular gospels and seems to be different from the lost Gospel of the Twelve.
 Gospel of Perfection – 4th century, an Ophite poem that is only mentioned once by a single patristic source, Epiphanius, and is referred to once in the 6th century Syriac Infancy Gospel
 Coptic Gospel of the Egyptians – also called Holy Book of the Great Invisible Spirit

Jewish-Christian gospels

 Gospel of the Hebrews
 Gospel of the Nazarenes
 Gospel of the Ebionites
 Gospel of the Twelve

Infancy gospels
 Armenian Infancy Gospel
 Protoevangelium of James
  (Gospel of the Nativity of Mary)
 Gospel of Pseudo-Matthew
 History of Joseph the Carpenter
 Infancy Gospel of Thomas
 Latin Infancy Gospel (also known as the "J Composition")
 Syriac Infancy Gospel

Other gospels
 Gospel of the Lots of Mary (Coptic collection of 37 oracles; around 500 AD)

Partially preserved gospels
 Gospel of Peter

Fragmentary preserved gospels
Fragmentary gospels are those preserved from primary sources.

 Gospel of Eve – mentioned only once by Epiphanius around 400 AD, who preserves a single brief passage in quotation
 Gospel of Mani – 3rd century – attributed to the Persian Mani, the founder of Manichaeism
 Gospel of the Saviour (also known as the Unknown Berlin gospel) – highly fragmentary 6th century manuscript based on a late 2nd or early 3rd century original, a dialogue rather than a narrative, heavily Gnostic in character in that salvation is dependent upon possessing secret knowledge
 Coptic Gospel of the Twelve – late 2nd century Coptic language work – although often equated with the Gospel of the Ebionites, it appears to be an attempt to retell the Gospel of John in the pattern of the Synoptics; it quotes extensively from the Gospel of John.

Reconstructed gospels
Reconstructed gospels are those preserved from secondary sources and commentaries.

 Secret Gospel of Mark – suspect: the single source mentioning it is considered by many to be a modern forgery, and it was lost before it could be independently authenticated. 
 Gospel of Matthias – a lost text from the New Testament apocrypha. The content has been surmised from descriptions in works by church fathers.

Lost gospels
 Gospel of Cerinthus – around 90–120 AD – according to Epiphanius, this is a Jewish gospel identical to the Gospel of the Ebionites, and apparently, a truncated version of the Gospel of Matthew according to the Hebrews.
 Gospel of Apelles – mid- to late 2nd century, a further edited version of Marcion's edited version of Luke
 Gospel of Valentinus
 Gospel of the Encratites
 Gospel of Andrew – mentioned by only two 5th century sources (Augustine and Pope Innocent I) who list it as apocryphal
 Gospel of Barnabas – this work is mentioned only once, in the 5th century Decree of Gelasius, which lists it as apocryphal. 
 Gospel of Bartholomew – mentioned by only two 5th century sources, which list it as apocryphal.
 Gospel of Hesychius – mentioned only by Jerome and the Decree of Gelasius that list it as apocryphal.
 Gospel of Lucius – mentioned only by Jerome and the Decree of Gelasius that list it as apocryphal.
 Gospel of Merinthus – mentioned only by Epiphanius; probably the Gospel of Cerinthus, and the confusion due to a scribal error.
 An unknown number of other Gnostic gospels not cited by name.
 Gospel of the Adversary of the Law and the Prophets
 Memoirs of the Apostles – lost narrative of the life of Jesus, mentioned by Justin Martyr, the passages quoted by Justin may have originated from a gospel harmony of the Synoptic Gospels composed by Justin or his school.

Fragments of possibly unknown or lost (or existing) gospels
Fragmentary gospels are those preserved from primary sources.

 Papyrus Egerton 2 – late 2nd century manuscript of possibly earlier original; contents parallel John 5:39–47, 10:31–39; Matthew 1:40–45, 8:1–4, 22:15–22; Mark 1:40–45, 12:13–17; and Luke 5:12–16, 17:11–14, 20:20–26, but differ textually; also contains incomplete miracle account with no equivalent in canonical Gospels
 Fayyum Fragment – a fragment of about 100 Greek letters in 3rd century script; the text seems to parallel Mark 14:26–31
 Oxyrhynchus Papyri – fragments #1, 654, and 655 appear to be fragments of Thomas; #210 is related to Matthew 7:17–19 and Luke 6:43–44 but not identical to them; #840 contains a short vignette about Jesus and a Pharisee not found in any known gospel, the source text is probably mid-2nd century; #1224 consists of paraphrases of Mark 2:17 and Luke 9:50
 Gospel of Jesus' Wife – modern forgery based on the Gospel of Thomas
 Papyrus Berolinensis 1171book of Enoch 0 – 6th century Greek fragment, possibly from an apocryphal gospel or amulet based on John.
 Papyrus Cairensis 10735 – 6th or 7th century Greek fragment, possibly from a lost gospel, may be a homily or commentary
 Papyrus Merton 51 – fragment from apocryphal gospel or a homily on Luke 6:7
 Strasbourg Fragment – fragment of a lost gospel, probably related to Acts of John

Medieval gospels
 Gospel of the Seventy – a lost 8th or 9th century Manichean work
 Gospel of Nicodemus – a post-10th century Christian devotional work (or works) in many variants, the first section is highly dependent upon the 5th century Acts of Pilate
 Gospel of Barnabas – a 16th century harmony of the four canonical gospels, probably of Spanish (Morisco) origin, or possibly Italian
 Gospel of the Secret Supper – a 12th century Cathar scripture

Modern gospels

 The Aquarian Gospel of Jesus the Christ (1908)
 Book of Mormon (1830)
 Crucifixion of Jesus, by an Eyewitness (1907)
 Essene Gospel of Peace (1937; 1974)
 The Fifth Gospel (1908, Steiner)
 The Fifth Gospel (1956, Naber) 
 The Fifth Gospel (1993, Vandenberg), Novel
 The Gospel Given at Ares (1974)
 Gospel of Jesus According to Gabriele Wittek (1977)
 Gospel of Josephus (1927)
 Gospel of the Childhood of Our Lord Jesus Christ According to St. Peter (1904)
 The Gospel of the Holy Twelve (1881)
 Life and Morals of Jesus (1820)
 Jehoshua the Nazir (1917)
 The Mystical Life of Jesus (1929)
 The Unknown Life of Jesus Christ (1894)
 The Urantia Book (1955)
 Ur-Gospel of the Essenes (1848)
 Great Gospel of John (1851–1864)
 The Jesus Scroll (1972)
 The Poem of the Man-God (1956)

See also 

 Acts of the Apostles (genre)
 Agrapha
 Development of the New Testament canon
 Diatessaron
 Gnosticism
 The Gospel of the Flying Spaghetti Monster
 The Gospel of Sri Ramakrishna
 The Gospel of Wealth
 Injil
 List of New Testament papyri
 The Missing Gospels
 New Testament epistles
 Non-canonical books referenced in the Bible
 Textual criticism
 Toledot Yeshu – medieval Jewish version of the story of Jesus

Notes

Footnotes

References
 New Testament Apocrypha, by Wilhelm Schneemelcher, R. M. Wilson.
 New Testament Apocrypha: Gospels and Related Writings, by Wilhelm Schneemelcher, R. M. Wilson.
 History of the Christian Religion to the Year Two Hundred, by Charles B. Waite.

External links
 The Fifth Gospel Five lectures given by Rudolf Steiner in 1913

List
Ancient Christian texts
Ancient Christian controversies
Christianity-related lists
Lists of books by genre
New Testament-related lists